Fire Rescue Victoria (FRV) is a fire and rescue service in the state of Victoria, Australia, that provides firefighting, rescue, HAZMAT and Emergency Medical Response services in areas of metropolitan Melbourne and major regional centres throughout Victoria. 

FRV operates 85 fire stations with full-time staff firefighters, around half of which are in the Melbourne metropolitan area, and the remainder in regional cities and large towns throughout the state. 34 of these stations which are classified as peri-urban and regional stations, are co-located with volunteer brigades of the Country Fire Authority (CFA). 

FRV was formed on 1 July 2020 by a merger of the Metropolitan Fire Brigade (MFB), a fully career service responsible for much of the Greater Melbourne area, with the 1400 career firefighters of the CFA, some of whom had operated in "integrated" staff and volunteer brigades on the Melbourne urban fringe and in other centres. FRV Deputy Commissioner Ken Block stated on 1 July 2020 that under the CFA and MFB merge; Fire Rescue Victoria is now made up of more than 3600 operational firefighters.

History

With the passage of the Fire Brigades Act 1890 by the Parliament of Victoria, the colony of Victoria's fire services were divided into two components. The Metropolitan Fire Brigade, largely a paid professional force, was established to serve the Metropolitan Fire District, roughly encompassing the area within a ten-mile radius of the Melbourne CBD; and the volunteer brigades in remainder of the colony was placed under the control of the Country Fire Brigades Board. Several reforms to the fire services over the following half-century left this basic structure in place, and in 1958 the MFB and what had become the Country Fire Authority were re-established under their own Acts of Parliament to, respectively, provide full-time fire services to the MFD, and to establish, coordinate and fund fire brigades in the rest of the state, whether "permanent or volunteer".

The Acts provided for the boundaries of the Metropolitan Fire District to be reviewed and altered, and in the 1960s the MFD was expanded to cover most of what was then metropolitan Melbourne. It was, however, to be the last significant such expansion. From around the same time, the United Firefighters Union, which represented MFB employees, began to campaign for the amalgamation of MFB and CFA in combination with a significant expansion of the paid firefighting force. The move was resisted by the CFA Officers' Association and senior management, as well as conservative governments unsympathetic to the UFU.
When a Labor state government in 1982, for the first time in 27 years, it immediately set about reforming the fire services, and proposed governing the MFB and CFA under a single Victorian Fire and Emergency Services Board, with a general manager responsible for the day-to-day operation of each service. Volunteers' associations strenuously opposed the idea, arguing that Labor governments would use the opportunity to allocate fewer resources to country firefighting, and that a Melbourne-based bureaucracy was incapable of understanding the needs of country firefighters.

Following the Black Saturday bushfires, the 2009 Victorian Bushfires Royal Commission (2009 VBRC) recommended that a Fire Commissioner be appointed to advise on the boundary between the two services, the Metropolitan Fire District.  The 2009 VBRC also recommended strengthening the CFA's integrated model, in which paid and volunteer firefighters trained, were located and responded together using the same equipment and training.

The origins of the service created significant political controversy. The genesis for the proposal to split paid and volunteer firefighters, creating two separate services where the integrated turnout model would no long apply, was to resolve an industrial dispute arising from Enterprise Bargaining Agreement negotiations between the CFA (and separately the MFB) and the UFU. These negotiations, which started in 2014 and were still causing problems for the government in 2017, raised objections by VFBV, volunteers, the leaders of the fire services themselves and the Minister for Emergency Services at the time, Jane Garrett MP, who resigned rather than support a deal Stefan Gaiseanu said was "unworkable." The key objections related to concerns that the EBA would significantly disadvantage CFA volunteers and the ability of the CFA Chief Officer to manage them, and the powers of the Chief Officer. Statements by the CEOs and Chief Officers of the CFA and MFB, Emergency Management Victoria, VFBV and others at the Select Committee into the Bill canvassed serious concerns about the impact of the EBA and said that splitting the fire services to resolve an industrial dispute would compromise public safety.

In October 2016 the Australian Federal government passed amendments to the Fair Work Act 2009. These amendments were to prevent any enterprise bargaining agreement terms that "[affect] the ability of an organisation to engage, deploy, support, equip or manage its volunteers". The Government of Victoria stated that creating an enterprise agreement while maintaining a combined career and volunteer firefighting service would be very difficult without such terms.

Governance

Legislation
The Fire Rescue Victoria Act 1958, amended and retitled from the Metropolitan Fire Brigades Act 1958, establishes the Fire Rescue Commissioner as the head of a body corporate named Fire Rescue Victoria, the successor in law to the Metropolitan Fire and Emergency Services Board. The functions of FRV set out by the Act are: 
The Act also requires FRV to assist in the response to any major emergency within Victoria, in cooperation with other emergency service organisations and under the direction of Emergency Management Victoria (EMV). The Act grants FRV broad powers to carry out its functions as directed by the Commissioner. Additional powers and duties of FRV and the Commissioner are established by other legislation, including:
Electricity Safety Act 1998
Emergency Management Act 1986
Emergency Management Act 2013
Gas Safety Act 1997
Building Act 1993
Building Regulations 2018.

In the State Emergency Response Plan published by EMV, FRV is the control agency within the FRV Fire District for accidents, including gas leaks, hazardous materials incidents and collapses; fires and explosions; and transport, industrial, high angle and confined space rescues. It supports CFA with these incidents outside the FRV Fire District and other agencies as required.

The Fire Rescue Commissioner and any Deputy Commissioners are appointed by the Governor of Victoria on the advice of the Minister responsible for fire services, for a period of not longer than five years. The Minister may give the Commissioner general direction on policies and priorities of Fire Rescue Victoria but has no power to make operational or strategic decisions, such as on the location of fire stations or the conduct of firefighting operations.

Fire District Review Panel
The FRV Act establishes a three-member Fire District Review Panel required to report at least every four years, or on the request of the Minister, on whether the boundaries Fire Rescue Victoria Fire District should be altered to provide for appropriate emergency services coverage. Members of the Review Panel are required to have expertise in fire and emergency services policy, but must not be current members of a Victorian fire service, firefighters' union or volunteers' association.

The final decision on whether to alter the FRV Fire District boundaries is that of the Minister. However, any recommendations of the Review Panel must be made publicly available by both FRV and CFA, regardless of whether they are accepted.

The Fire District Review Panel mechanism was initially recommended by the Royal Commission into the 2009 bushfires. It is intended to provide an objective, independent decision-making process for determining where professional and volunteer firefighters operate, in order to alleviate some of the tensions which led to the formation of FRV. However, the initial FRV Fire District was not subject to the Review Panel process.

Structure
The inaugural Fire Rescue Commissioner, Ken Block, is supported by six Deputy Commissioners and a Deputy Secretary. One Deputy Commissioner is attached to the Office of the Fire Rescue Commissioner. Two operational regions, North & West and South, East & Central, are led by Deputy Commissioners. Three further Deputy Commissioners are assigned to the portfolios of Fire Safety, Strategy and Operational Training. The Deputy Secretary leads non-operational and corporate services.

Each of the North & West and South, East & Central regions are further divided into five districts, as follows:

Stations and equipment

Appliance overview

All FRV stations operate at least one pumper or pumper tanker, with stations 1 (Eastern Hill) and 42 (Newport) operating an Ultra Large Pumper. Aerial and specialist appliances are located across the Melbourne area and in many of the regional cities, from where they also provide support into CFA areas.

A system of modular "pods", carried by Transporters fitted with hydraulic lift arms, is also used to support specialised operations.

Stations

History of Legislation  
The legislation was presented to the Victorian Upper house just before Easter 2018, and led to a record sitting to allow it to pass, including controversy over pairing of a cross bench member and accusations the Government was using the absence of a sick MP, an independent who was the casting vote on the legislation, to push through a vote in her absence by extending the sitting into Good Friday, which had never happened before.  The legislation was defeated on the third reading on Easter Sunday. The bill was a "Disputed Bill"  and could be considered after the next election by a committee known as the Dispute Resolution Committee in line with the Constitutional (Parliamentary Reform) Act 2003. The bill was reintroduced on 29 May 2019 and passed through both houses on 20 June 2019.

References

Bibliography

External links
 Fire Services Reform information page at Department of Premier and Cabinet website

Fire and rescue services of Victoria (Australia)